Donna Terry Weiss is an American singer and songwriter. She won a Grammy Award in 1982 for co-writing "Bette Davis Eyes" (1974) with Jackie DeShannon.

Songwriter/composer credits
 "Bette Davis Eyes" (1974) with Jackie DeShannon - In 1982, Weiss won a Grammy Award for co-writing this song.
 "The Heart Won't Lie" (1993) - recorded by Reba McEntire and Vince Gill The song debuted at number 51 on the Hot Country Singles & Tracks chart dated February 20, 1993. It charted for 20 weeks on that chart, and reached Number One on the chart dated April 10, 1993, where it stayed for two weeks. It was McEntire's seventeenth Number One single, and Gill's third Number One.- https://en.wikipedia.org/wiki/The_Heart_Won%27t_Lie
 "When The Money's Gone"(Cher)"Living Proof" 2002/2003 Warner bros., https://www.allmusic.com/song/when-the-moneys-gone-mt0013512429, allmusic
 "When the Money's Gone" (1995) - recorded by Bruce Roberts
 "Explícame" Terra Firma) Luis Fonsi, (2011) -\Universal/latino, (Despacito & Mis Grandes Exitos MCA 2017,https://www.allmusic.com/album/despacito-mis-grandes-exitos-mw0003068262
 (Duets)(Gweneth Paltrow) (Original Motion picture soundtrack) "Bette Davis Eyes",Hollywood Records, 2000, 0122412HWR, writer/pub discogs
 (L. Devine) (Peachy Keen)(Near Life Experience pPt2)ep, label: All Media, (2019) writer/pub, allmusic,https://www.allmusic.com/album/peachy-keen-mw0003320412/releases 
 Taylor Swift) (Speak Now World Tour Live CD+DVD)(Bette Davis Eyes) Big Machine Records BMRTS0340b, 2011delux edition,allmusic, https://www.allmusic.com/song/bette-davis-eyes-mt0042391525
 (Belinda Carlisle) You Don't Die From Love/ The Air You Breathe/Virgin 1992 The Air You Breathe by Belinda Carlisle ; Release date: 1992-08-17 ; Label: Virgin ; Catalog number: VSCDT 1428 ; EAN: 5012980142828 ; Format: Single CD
 (Sweet Amarillo) (Remedy) recorded by (Old Crow Medicine Show) ATO Records,ATO0242, 2014, writer/pub>allmusic, https://www.allmusic.com/song/sweet-amarillo-mt0049654794
 (Tiffany)-( Hold An Old Friend's Hand) MCA,6267 1988, MCAC53612, 1989,GEFFEN STRATEGIC MARKETING 2010
CD, Allmusic, https://www.allmusic.com/album/hold-an-old-friends-hand-mw0000197411/releases,Hold an Old Friend's Hand is the second studio album by American pop singer Tiffany, released in November 1988. The album was commercially successful, achieving a platinum certification, peaking at #17 on the U.S. charts.
 (Tiffany) (Spanish Eyes) Off of Tiffany cd released 1987, MCA, allmusic,> https://www.allmusic.com/song/spanish-eyes-mt0001948129
 (Dee Dee Warwick) I turn Around And Love You Dee Dee Warwick /The complete Atco Recordings 2014>allmusic, https://www.allmusic.com/song/turn-around-and-love-you-mt0006085652
 (Margie Joseph) I Turn Around And Love You /Margie Joseph 1971 Atlantic records / Discogs
 (Kim Carnes) (Gypsy Honeymoon)(Don't Cry Now) 1993/EMI Records/US & Canada,0777-7-98223-2 4, E2-98223,https://www.allmusic.com/album/gypsy-honeymoon-best-of-kim-carnes-mw0000093328
 (Kim Carnes) (Lighthouse)That's Where The Trouble Lies)(Divided Hearts)(Piece Of The Sky)(Only Lonely Love)  1986/EMI Records/US & Canada,UK/ writer/pub>https://www.allmusic.com/album/light-house-mw0000944583
 (Kim Carnes) (View From The House)(Brass and Batons)(Blood From The Bandit)(Crimes Of The Heart)(Just To Spend Tonight With You)  1988/MCA Records/writer/pub,allmusic> https://www.allmusic.com/album/view-from-the-house-mw0000196563
 (Kim Carnes) (Checkin Out The Ghosts)(Tears Edge)(River Of Memories)(Look Through Children's Eyes)(nothing Better Than Love) 1991/Teichiku Records, writer/pub>https://www.allmusic.com/album/release/checkin-out-the-ghosts-mr0001569539
 (Phillip Bailey) (Chinese Wall/Inside Out) "Echo My Heart)(Welcome to the Club) 2012, allmusic
 (Dusty Springfield) (What Do You Do When Love Dies) Complete Atlantic singles) 
 (Dusty Springfield) (What Do You Do When Love Dies)"A Brand New Me"1992, 2005 Rhino r27136 all music
 (Jackie DeShannon) (New Arrangement) CBS/Columbia/(Barefoot Boys and Barefoot Girls)(Sweet Baby Gene)(Queen Of The Rodeo)/writer/pub 1975,>https://www.allmusic.com/album/new-arrangement-mw0000769197
 (Jackie DeShannon) (Jackie DeShannon/Your Baby Is A Lady) Atlantic 1974/single writer pub discogs
 (Jackie DeShannon) (Jackie) (I won't try to Put Chains On Your Soul) Atlantic/1972/writer/pub,> https://www.allmusic.com/album/jackie-mw0000849416
 (Rita Coolidge) (Fall Into Spring) (Your Baby Is A Lady) A&M Records, 1974/writer/pub, (Hold An Old Friend's Hand)A&M Records 1974, writer/pub>discogs
 (Rita Coolidge) (Rita Coolidge) A&M Records, 1971,2001, (Mud Island) Single/ writer/pub, (That Man Is My Weakness) A&M Records, 1971, writer/pub, allmusic, >https://www.allmusic.com/album/rita-coolidge-mw0000458992
 (Rita Coolidge) (Rita Coolidge) A&M Records, 1975,(Star), single, A&M Records, writer/pub, discogs
 (Rita Coolidge) (Delta Lady The Rita Coolidge Anthology) (I turn Around And Love You),A&M Records, allmusic,>https://www.allmusic.com/album/delta-lady-the-rita-coolidge-anthology-mw0000326739
 (Rita Coolidge) (Rita Coolidge) (It Just Keeps You Dancing) AMLH64699/A&M Records, 1978,writer/pub>discogs
 (Sonia Davis) (Bette Davis Eyes)(Paradise Project records)-PPR018, 1992, Italy, Pub/writer discogs
 (The Chipmunks) (Bette Davis Eyes)/Heartbreaker 1982,RCA -104012, JH-13098,Writer/pub>discogs
 (Rogue Wave) (Cover Me) (Bette Davis Eyes) Easy Sound Recording Company, ES023, 2017, writer/pub.>discogs
 "I Want You" (1965) - artist, produced by Shelby Singleton; written by Weiss in 1965 when she was a teenager living in Nashville.
 (Turn Around And Love You)(Irma Thomas)"Full Time Woman", Cotillian,2014,allmusic,>https://www.allmusic.com/album/full-time-woman-the-lost-cotillion-album-mw0002613576
 "Sweet Amarillo" (1974) - Weiss performed the song several occasions on the second leg of Bob Dylan's Rolling Thunder Revue concert tour.

Discography

Singles
 "I'm Only Human / Bonafide Love Me" (Atco 45-6688) (1969)
 "One Night a Week / That Kind of Woman" (Atco 45-6730) (1970)
 "I Want You/Take Me Now" (Mercury -72489)(1969)Tony and Terri
 "California L.A./Everybody Can't Play Shortstop", Monuments Records Ray Stevens producer )1967)Tony and Terri
 "Mr. Flower Vendor Man/Shades of Gray" (Monument) 1968 Fred Foster/Ray Stevens Producer, Tony and Terri
 "Back On My Feet Again/For No One" (Monument), Ray Stevens producer, Toni and Terri
 

As backing vocalist

 Joe Cocker – Mad Dogs & Englishmen (1970)
 Al Kooper – New York City (You're A Woman) (1971)
 Priscilla Jones – Gypsy Queen (1971)
 Rita Coolidge – Rita Coolidge (1971)
 Sandy Szigeti – America's Sweetheart (1971)
 Ry Cooder – Into the Purple Valley (1972)
 Rita Coolidge – The Lady's Not for Sale (1972)
 Hoyt Axton – Less Than The Song (1972)
 Bob Dylan – Pat Garrett & Billy the Kid Knocking On Heavens Door,(1973)
 Brenda Patterson – Brenda Patterson (1973)
 Sharon Cash – Sharon Cash (1973)
 Kim Carnes  "Lighthouse" (1986)

References

Living people
Place of birth missing (living people)
Year of birth missing (living people)
American women singer-songwriters
21st-century American women